Wasiem Taha, better known as Massiv (born 9 November 1982), is a gangsta rapper living in Berlin. During his early career Taha was signed to the label Horrorkore Entertainment, but later he left and signed to major label Sony BMG. He acts in the German TV-Series 4 Blocks (TV series)

Life and career

Early life  
Taha had been influenced by hip-hop from an early age. He visited Berlin for the first time in 1996, where he would struggle to find a job having not finished school.

2006: Early career and debut album 

In July 2006 Taha's debut album, Blut gegen Blut, was released. On 22 August, Taha left the Horrorkore Entertainment label and signed to Sony BMG. Reasons for the separation were not mentioned.

The label has reportedly invested 250,000 euros into Taha's career. Frankfurt-based rapper Azad said in an interview that he was interested to sign Taha onto his label, Bozz Music.

Shooting 
In January 2008, Taha was purportedly shot three times by a masked man while talking on a cell phone near his car. Taha was subsequently hospitalized and lost a lot of blood, but was apparently able to leave the hospital later that same night. The Independent reported a rumor that the incident was a publicity stunt.

Discography

Solo

Singles

Free tracks and other releases

See also

References

German rappers
German people of Palestinian descent
Shooting survivors
1982 births
Living people
Gangsta rappers